The Pills – Sempre meglio che lavorare is a 2016 Italian comedy film by The Pills.

Cast
Matteo Corradini as Matteo
Luigi Di Capua as Luigi
Luca Vecchi as Luca
Giancarlo Esposito as Bangla Boss
Margherita Vicario as Giulia
Francesca Reggiani as Matteo's mother
Giulio Corradini as Matteo's father
Mattia Coluccia as Mattia
Betani Mapunzo as Betani
Luca Di Capua as Luca
Angela Favella as Angela
Andrea Colicchia as Maurizio

References

External links
 

2016 films
2016 comedy films
Films set in Rome
Films shot in Rome
Italian comedy films
2010s Italian films